Sakara can refer to:

Music
Sakara drum, an instrument played by the Yoruba and Hausa peoples of Nigeria.
Sakara music, a Nigerian musical form using Sakara drums and other traditional instruments
Sakara Records, a Finnish metal / rock record label

Places
Saqqara, a huge, ancient burial ground in Egypt near Giza
Kveda Sakara, a village in the Caucasian country of Georgia
Zeda Sakara, a village in the Caucasian country of Georgia

People
Alessio Sakara (born 1981), an Italian mixed martial arts fighter
Julia Sakara (born 1969), a retired Zimbabwean middle distance runner
Lasse Sakara, a Finnish acoustic guitarist who appeared on the 2005 album Country Falls by Husky Rescue
Michele Sakara, an actress who appeared in the 1954 Italian-French comedy film A Slice of Life
Sakara Pandi, a fictional character in the 2007 Tamil film Vel

See also 
Sakkara (disambiguation)